Chicken is a 2001 Irish short film directed by Barry Dignam about the way adolescent males sometimes redirect their feelings of affection for each other into often violent or competitive activities such as games of chicken.

Plot
Mick (Darren Healy) and Kev (Niall O'Shea) spend a late afternoon near railroad tracks by the seaside where Mick teaches Kev how to "shotgun" beer for reasons then unknown to the viewer. He observes that Kev is "a bit of a wuss" after he fails to replicate the proper shotgunning technique and calls for Kev to come sit close to him for a test of courage, the knife game, which involves stabbing a knife between outstretched fingers at an ever-faster rate. The game is usually played with one person's hand at a time and as a gesture of what may be seen as self-sacrifice, Mick puts his hand over Kev's in order to shield Kev's hand from the brunt of an injury should it occur.

When a train speeds by them, Mick accidentally cuts Kev and himself very slightly with the knife. They clasp each other's hands tightly and Mick, who suddenly seems very insecure and in need of affection is lovingly embraced by Kev, who perhaps has known all along why Mick brought him here.

A single screen of credits appears, then the film ends with a brief shot of the two in silhouette, standing apart, watching the sun set over the ocean.

Production
Chicken was shot over two days on 35 mm film with a Dolby Digital soundtrack.

The title of the short film is a double entendre, since "chicken" is also a slang term for a young homosexual.

Awards and accolades

References

External links
 — information page on Barry Dignam's official website

Chicken on Vimeo — the full short film in HD.
 — the full short film in medium resolution.

2001 films
Irish short films
Irish LGBT-related films
LGBT-related short films
2001 short films
2001 LGBT-related films
English-language Irish films
2000s English-language films